Delingha, or Delhi (SASM/GNC/SRC romanization of Mongolian: Delhi hot),  is the seat of the Haixi Mongol and Tibetan Autonomous Prefecture in northern Qinghai province, China. It is a mainly industrial county-level city. The Bayin River divides the city into two parts: Hedong and Hexi. Because the prefecture seat is located in Hedong, it is slightly more flourishing than Hexi, which is chiefly agricultural.

The name of the city comes from Mongolian and means "golden world" , reflecting the relatively large Mongol population of the city. Da Qaidam administrative zone merged into Delingha in mid-2018.

Geography

Climate
Delingha has a cold arid climate (Köppen BWk), that borders on a semi-arid climate (Köppen BSk).

Transportation
The Delingha Airport and Delingha railway station serve the city.

Economy and industry
Delingha will be home to a 400 million yuan "Mars village" used by the Chinese Academy of Sciences to plan future Mars explorations missions.

References

 
Amdo
County-level divisions of Qinghai
Cities in Qinghai
Haixi Mongol and Tibetan Autonomous Prefecture